Everybody's Golf is a sports video game developed by Clap Hanz and Japan Studio and published by Sony Interactive Entertainment for the PlayStation 4. It is the twelfth game in the Everybody's Golf video game series, and was released worldwide in August 2017.

Gameplay
The game features character creation and customization, online play and the ability to free roam around the game's golf courses. Players are also able to drive golf carts anywhere around the course.

Development and release
The game was revealed at a press briefing prior to the Tokyo Game Show in September 2014, with a planned release in 2015. Shuhei Yoshida of Sony's Worldwide Studios said that the game features open world elements for the first time in the history of the series.

The game marks the end of the alternate Hot Shots branding for the North American market, with the title Everybody's Golf being used worldwide.

The pre-order pack before the game's release consisted of a number of in-game items: a course to celebrate the 20th anniversary of the game series, a premium golf cart, exclusive character costumes and a PlayStation 4 dashboard theme. An update was released in collaboration with Level-5, who were celebrating their 20th anniversary and had a close relationship with Sony during their early years. It adds characters to the game from their Dark Cloud, White Knight Chronicles, Ni no Kuni II, Professor Layton, and Yo-kai Watch franchises.

In March 2022, Clap Hanz announced the end of all online support for Everybody's Golf. The game's online services were eventually terminated on 30 September 2022.

Reception

Everybody's Golf received "generally favorable" reviews, according to review aggregator Metacritic.

Accolades
The game was nominated for "PlayStation Game of the Year at the Golden Joystick Awards.  In Game Informers Reader's Choice Best of 2017 Awards, it came in fourth place for "Best Sports Game". The game was also nominated for "Sports Game of the Year" at the D.I.C.E. Awards, for "Game, Franchise Sports" at the National Academy of Video Game Trade Reviewers Awards, and for "Best Casual Game" and "Best Social Game" at The Independent Game Developers' Association Awards 2018.

References

External links 

2017 video games
Golf video games
PlayStation 4 games
PlayStation 4-only games
Sony Interactive Entertainment games
Everybody's Golf
Video games developed in Japan
PlayStation 4 Pro enhanced games